Benyu is both a Chinese given name and a surname. Notable people with the name include

Surname 
 Kundai Benyu (born 1997), English-born Zimbabwean professional footballer

Given name 
 Qi Benyu (1931–2016), Chinese Communist theorist and propagandist